Rustam Durmonov (born 28 January 1969), is former Uzbek professional footballer.

Career
Durmonov played in Surkhon Termez in Soviet Second League from 1985-1989. He joined Neftyannik Fergana in 1990. In 1992–1994 he became three times Uzbekistan champion with Neftchi Farg'ona.

The most time of career Durmonov played for Neftchi, scoring 116 goals for the club in Uzbek League matches. Totally he scored 133 goals in league matches for different clubs.

International
He made his debut in the national team on 17 June 1992 in friendly match against Tajikistan. He played 14 matches and scored 2 goals.

Honours

Club

 Uzbek League (4): 1992, 1993, 1994, 2001
 Uzbek Cup (2): 1992, 1996

International
 Asian Games: 1994

Individual
 Uzbekistan Footballer of the Year  2nd: 1993
 Uzbek League Top Scorer: 1993 (26 goals)
 Gennadi Krasnitsky club: 172 goals

References

External links

1969 births
Living people
Soviet footballers
Uzbekistani footballers
Uzbekistan international footballers
Association football forwards
Asian Games gold medalists for Uzbekistan
Asian Games medalists in football
Footballers at the 1994 Asian Games
Medalists at the 1994 Asian Games